The Cluster Munitions (Prohibition) Bill 2006 is a bill for an act to ensure that civilians in conflict zones are not maimed, killed or put at risk as a result of Australians possessing, using or manufacturing cluster munitions. Senator Lyn Allison, leader of the Australian Democrats, introduced the bill into the Australian Senate on 5 December 2006. On the same day, she dispersed the contents of a model cluster munition from a balcony at Parliament House, Canberra, as an educational exercise.

The bill was co-sponsored by Senator Andrew Bartlett of the Australian Democrats, Senator Mark Bishop of the Australian Labor Party, and Senator Bob Brown of the Australian Greens. The Senate Foreign Affairs, Defence and Trade Committee will review the provisions of the bill and has invited submissions from organizations with a possible interest in the bill. It is due to conclude its review in mid-March 2007. A spokesperson from the office of the Minister for Defence indicated that the Australian Government did not intend to support the bill.

Effect of the bill if enacted 

The bill prevents members of the Australian Defence Force (ADF), whether serving in Australia or elsewhere, and whether serving with the ADF or any other defence force, from deploying cluster munitions. Under the bill, a person must not intentionally develop, produce, otherwise acquire, stockpile, retain, transfer, use or engage in military preparations to use cluster munitions, container units or submunitions. A member of the ADF must not engage in military preparations for a member of the defence force of another country to use cluster munitions, container units or submunitions.

The bill extends to acts by an Australian citizen outside Australia and to acts done on board Australian ships and aircraft. The offences set out in the bill do not apply in relation to the clearing of unexploded submunitions, education in relation to cluster munitions, or decommissioning. The bill provides that any Australian citizen or resident in Australia or an external territory may take certain legal steps to ensure that it is properly complied with.

Under the bill, the Minister for Defence must, within three months of the commencement of the Act, table in both Houses of the Federal Parliament a report on stockpiles and a decommissioning plan. Further, he or she must, within one year, decommission all cluster munitions in the possession of the ADF. The minister representing the Minister for Defence in the Senate informed the Senate on 4 December 2006, that Australia does not maintain a stockpile of cluster munitions; however, it did possess a small arsenal from the 1970s through the 1990s.

Political history of Australia
Cluster munition